Cheng Siu Wai (born 27 December 1981, Hong Kong) is a former Hong Kong professional footballer player whose position was striker. His shirt name was Henry.

Early life
Cheng Siu Wai is born to a Hong Kong father and a Thai mother. They separated when he was a young boy, his mother returned to Thailand and he grew up in a single parent family in a housing estate in Sheung Shui. There was a 5-a-side football field at the estate and he started playing there since primary school.

He finished his studies after reaching form 3. He was working as an electrician and playing amateur football in Yuen Long, when he was asked if he wanted to play football as a professional. He is popularly known as Henry because of his uncanny physical resemblance to the French striker.

Club career

Double Flower
Cheng Siu Wai made his Hong Kong First Division League debut in 2002 with Double Flower. He scored his first goal on the same day with a volley at Mong Kok Stadium.

Rangers
Cheng Siu Wai was released by Buler Rangers one month before the end of the 2004–05 Hong Kong First Division League season because he failed to reach the club's expectations.

South China AA
When Cheng Siu Wai first joined South China, his monthly salary was only HK$4,000 (approx US$500). By the time he left in 2008, it went up to HK$11,000 (approx US$1,375). Because of his difficult financial situation, he lived in the club's quarters and only returned home once a week.

He was a member of the squad that got South China relegated at the end of the 2005–06 Hong Kong First Division League season. But the club was retained in the first division upon Steven Lo's appointment as the club's convener.

On 11 March 2008, Cheng Siu-wai scored two goals for South China against Home United FC of Singapore, at Mongkok Stadium in an AFC Cup group game. However, South China lost in the end by 2–3.

Cheng Siu Wai was made captain of the South China invitation XI to face Manchester City FC in the Premier League/Serie A Football Day.

TSW Pegasus
Cheng Siu Wai moved to TSW Pegasus FC when the club was formed at the end of 2008. He was named the club's captain. Cheng claimed he moved to get more playing time. Cheng scored against South China AA in the 2008–09 Hong Kong Senior Challenge Shield Cheng claimed beating South China was one of the teams' targets and he was very happy with the goal and victory. The club went on to win the tournament by beating Sun Hei SC 3:0 in the final. But after just one season at the club, he was loaned to Kitchee.

Kitchee
On 9 May 2010, Cheng Siu Wai scored two goals and helped Kitchee beat Happy Valley 6:0. On 31 May 2010, Cheng Siu-wai scored the equaliser for Kitchee against Beijing Guoan Talents in the 2010 Singapore Cup, forcing extra time which Kitchee won 2:1 in the end.

In the league, on 21 February 2011, Cheng Siu Wai scored in the 87th minute to help Kitchee beat Tai Po FC 2:1 to stay ahead of South China. Kitchee eventually beat South China to win the 2010–11 league title.

Sun Hei
Cheng Siu Wai signed to play for Sun Hei SC on 27 June 2011. Cheng said he has won numerous trophies in the past but never any individual awards. In the new season he hopes to win an individual award. He scored his first goal for Sun Hei on 17 September 2011 in a 2:1 win away to Tuen Mun SA. On 16 October 2011, Cheng Siu Wai became the first player to score a goal at the newly renovated Mong Kok Stadium, in a 5–0 win against Sham Shui Po SA. On 22 October, Cheng Siu Wai scored the winning goal against Biu Chun Rangers, just 1 minute from the end, to secure a 1–0 win. On 27 November, Cheng Siu Wai scored a goal against Tai Po FC in the 2011–12 Hong Kong Senior Challenge Shield quarter-final second leg match and was named Player of the month for October.

Kitchee SC
Kitchee general manager Ken Ng announced that Cheng Siu Wai will return to Kitchee after spending a season in Sunray Cave JC Sun Hei.

Eastern
Cheng joined Eastern in 2013 and made 26 appearances for the club. He retired from football in 2017 with his final match coming in Eastern's 3-0 win over Southern in the 2016-17 season playoff.

International career
He has been capped 11 times at international level for Hong Kong, and he has scored 7 goals. One of them a diving header against Bahrain in the 2011 AFC Asian Cup qualifier. It was the only goal Hong Kong managed in six qualification matches. In December 2011, Cheng Siu Wai was recalled to the Hong Kong team after consistent good performances for Sun Hei SC, to play in the 2012 Guangdong-Hong Kong Cup. He scored with a header from a Jack Sealy pass in the first leg and the match ended 2–2.

Personal life
Cheng Siu Wai grew up in a single parent family in Sheung Shui. He is the eldest son. He has a longtime girlfriend but does not plan to get married until he reaches 35 years old.

Despite his resemblance to Thierry Henry, his favourite player is David Beckham, after meeting him in an exhibition match between South China AA and Los Angeles Galaxy in 2008.

Honours
South China
Hong Kong First Division League: 2006–07，2007–08， 2008–09
Hong Kong Senior Challenge Shield: 2006–07
Hong Kong FA Cup: 2006–07
Hong Kong League Cup: 2007–08

TSW Pegasus
Hong Kong Senior Challenge Shield: 2008–09

Kitchee
Hong Kong First Division League: 2009–10，2010–11
Hong Kong FA Cup: 2012–13
Hong Kong Community Cup: 2009
Hong Kong Season Play-offs: 2012–13
HKFC Soccer Sevens: 2011

Sun Cave JC Sun Hei
Hong Kong Senior Challenge Shield: 2011–12

Eastern Long Lions
Hong Kong Premier League: 2015–16
Hong Kong FA Cup: 2013–14
Hong Kong Senior Challenge Shield: 2014–15，2015–16
Hong Kong Community Cup: 2016

Hong Kong
Hong Kong-Guangdong Cup: 2009，2012，2013
Hong Kong–Macau Interport: 2007

Career statistics

International career
Updated 7 December 2012.

References

External links
 Cheng Siu Wai's Yahoo blog
 Cheng Siu Wai at HKFA
 Player Information on TSW Pegasus website 
 

1981 births
Living people
Hong Kong footballers
Association football forwards
Hong Kong First Division League players
South China AA players
Hong Kong Rangers FC players
Double Flower FA players
TSW Pegasus FC players
Kitchee SC players
Sun Hei SC players
Eastern Sports Club footballers
Hong Kong international footballers